Hohenkarpfen is a mountain of Baden-Württemberg, Germany.  It is a popular tourist destination due to its picturesque shape and the view over the Black Forest. The peak has been a nature reserve since the 1930s.

Mountains and hills of the Swabian Jura